Harald Axel Fredrik Ljung (31 March 1884 – 5 February 1938) was a Swedish gymnast and track and field athlete who won an all-around gold medal with the Swedish gymnastics team at the 1908 Summer Olympics. He also participated in the 100 m sprint, 100 m hurdles and standing long jump events at the 1906 Intercalated Games and finished fifth in the long jump.

References

External links 
 

1884 births
1938 deaths
Sportspeople from Stockholm
Swedish male artistic gymnasts
Gymnasts at the 1908 Summer Olympics
Olympic gymnasts of Sweden
Olympic gold medalists for Sweden
Olympic medalists in gymnastics
Swedish male sprinters
Swedish male hurdlers
Swedish male long jumpers
Medalists at the 1908 Summer Olympics
20th-century Swedish people